Pseudimalmus fasciatus is a species of beetle in the family Cerambycidae, and the only species in the genus Pseudimalmus. It was described by Hintz in 1919.

References

Tragocephalini
Beetles described in 1919